Sherwin Marchel Vries (born 22 March 1980 in Walvis Bay, South Africa) is a sprinter who represents South Africa after switching from Namibia in 2003.

He finished fifth at the 2001 Summer Universiade and fourth at the 2006 African Championships in Athletics, both over 200 metres. He also reached the semi final at the 2003 World Championships in Athletics.

At the 2001 Universiade he also competed for the Namibian 4 x 100 metres relay team who set a national record of 39.48 seconds.

External links
 

1980 births
Living people
Sportspeople from Walvis Bay
South African male sprinters
Namibian male sprinters
Athletes (track and field) at the 2000 Summer Olympics
Olympic athletes of Namibia
Namibian emigrants to South Africa
Athletes (track and field) at the 1998 Commonwealth Games
Athletes (track and field) at the 2006 Commonwealth Games
Commonwealth Games competitors for Namibia
Commonwealth Games medallists in athletics
Commonwealth Games silver medallists for South Africa
African Games silver medalists for South Africa
African Games medalists in athletics (track and field)
Athletes (track and field) at the 2007 All-Africa Games
Medallists at the 2006 Commonwealth Games